Odair Santos (born 17 May 1981) is a visually impaired Paralympian athlete from Brazil competing mainly in T11 classification middle and long-distance events. A veteran of four Paralympics, Santos has won eight Paralympic medals, including four silver medals. Santos is also a four time IPC World champion at the 1,500 metres event, being unbeaten from 2006 to 2015.

Athletics career
Santos first represented Brazil at a Paralympic Games when he competed in the 2004 Summer Paralympics in Athens, Greece.  There he won a silver medal in the men's 5000 metres – T12 event, a silver medal in the men's 1500 metres – T13 event, a bronze medal in the men's 800 metres – T12 event and finished fourth in the men's 4 x 100 metre relay – T11-13 event.  He also competed at the 2008 Summer Paralympics in Beijing, China. There he won a bronze medal in the men's 800 metres – T12 event, a bronze medal in the men's 5000 metres – T13 event and a bronze medal in the men's 10000 metres – T12 event. At the 2012 Summer Paralympics he won silver in the Men's 1500 metres – T11 event.

In the buildup to the 2016 Summer Paralympics in Rio, Santos attended the 2015 IPC Athletics World Championships in Doha. There he took gold in the 1500m – T11, but the events of the 5000m – T11 final saw Santos dramatically lose a commanding lead on the last lap. In the closing stages of the race with Santos clear of the rest of the field he fell to the floor with exhaustion, on returning to his feet he was overtaken by Chile's Cristian Valenzuela. Despite the support of his guide, Santos collapsed a second time, and was passed by Jason Dunkerley of Canada. Santos rose again only to collapse meters from the line to lose the bronze medal place to Japan's Shinya Wada.

He holds the 800 m world record for T11 (totally blind) athletes.

References

External links

 

Paralympic athletes of Brazil
Athletes (track and field) at the 2004 Summer Paralympics
Athletes (track and field) at the 2008 Summer Paralympics
Paralympic silver medalists for Brazil
Paralympic bronze medalists for Brazil
Living people
1981 births
World record holders in Paralympic athletics
Athletes (track and field) at the 2012 Summer Paralympics
Medalists at the 2004 Summer Paralympics
Medalists at the 2008 Summer Paralympics
Medalists at the 2012 Summer Paralympics
Medalists at the 2016 Summer Paralympics
Athletes (track and field) at the 2016 Summer Paralympics
Brazilian male middle-distance runners
Brazilian male long-distance runners
Paralympic medalists in athletics (track and field)
Medalists at the 2007 Parapan American Games
Medalists at the 2011 Parapan American Games
Medalists at the 2015 Parapan American Games
20th-century Brazilian people
21st-century Brazilian people